James Donald Blain (born 9 April 1940) is an English professional footballer who made 501 appearances in the Football League playing as a left back or inside forward for Southport, Rotherham United, Carlisle United and Exeter City. Blain was born in Mossley Hill, Liverpool, and began his career as a youngster with Everton, but never played for their first team. After retiring from football he remained in the Exeter area and worked as a carpet fitter.

References

1940 births
Living people
Footballers from Liverpool
English footballers
Association football defenders
Association football inside forwards
Everton F.C. players
Southport F.C. players
Rotherham United F.C. players
Carlisle United F.C. players
Exeter City F.C. players
English Football League players